Rahle Godle is a mountain situated in Ali Sabieh Region of southern Djibouti.

Notes

References
Rahle Godle

Mountains of Djibouti